Huang Jiqing (30 March 1904 – 22 March 1995), also known by his courtesy name Huang Degan (Te-Kan Huang), was a Chinese geologist. He was born March 30, 1904 in Renshou, Sichuan to an intellectual family. In 1928 he obtained his bachelor's degree at Peking University, and in 1935 he got his PhD at University of Neuchâtel, Swiss. After returning to China he taught at National Central University and Peking University, and served as director of the National Geological Survey, president of the Geological Society of China, director of the Southwest Geological Bureau, deputy director of the Academic Division of Earth Sciences of the Chinese Academy of Sciences, deputy president of the Chinese Academy of Geological Sciences. In 1980 Huang received an honorary doctorate from the ETH Zurich, and in 1985 he was elected as an honorary member of Geological Society of America.

In 1932 Huang published The Permian Formations of Southern China, which provided the method to subdivide the Permian in China. In 1945 he pioneered to use the theory of polycyclic tectonic movement to treat the geotectonic characteristics of China. The first geotectonic map of China was also compiled under his supervision, for which he won a State Natural Science Award in 1982.

Asteroid 215023 Huangjiqing, discovered by the PMO NEO Survey Program in 2009, was named in his memory. The official  was published by the WGSBN in September 2021.

References

External links 
 Huang Jiqing. encyclopedia.com.

1904 births
1995 deaths
20th-century Chinese geologists
Members of Academia Sinica
Members of the Chinese Academy of Sciences
Academic staff of the National Central University
National University of Peking alumni
Academic staff of Peking University
University of Neuchâtel alumni